Fanny Solórzano Gautier (born 21 November 1970, in Madrid, Spain) is a Spanish actress. She is famous for portraying Alicia Jauregi in the Spanish television series Un paso adelante, and in the films Abre los ojos, Elsa y Fred and La Torre de Suso.

Personal life 
Fanny was born to a Spanish father and French mother in Madrid. She is bilingual in Spanish and French.
Fanny Solórzano Gautier has two children, twins, born in 2005.

Filmography

Films
 Abre los ojos (1997)
 La Femme du Cosmonaute (1998)
 Grandes ocasiones (1998)
 Amor, curiosidad, prozak y dudas (2001)
 Mi casa es tu casa (2002)
 Elsa y Fred (2005)
 La Torre de Suso (2007)

Television
 Antivicio (2000)
 Pasión adolescente (2001)
 Un paso adelante (2002–2005)
 Policías, en el corazón de la calle (2002)
 7 vidas (2003)
 Sin hogar (2003)
 Fuera de control (2006)
 Génesis, en la mente del asesino (2007)

Herself
 Pasapalabra (2003–2004)
 Channel nº 4 (2007)

References

External links 
 

1970 births
Living people
Actresses from Madrid
Spanish people of French descent
Spanish television actresses
Spanish film actresses
20th-century Spanish actresses
21st-century Spanish actresses